Diego Galdamez Coca (born August 26, 1994, in San Salvador) is a Salvadoran footballer who plays for Rush Soccer in the United States.

International career

U20 FIFA World Cup
During the 2013 FIFA U-20 World Cup, El Salvador was placed in Group C, where they were drawn against Turkey, Australia, and Colombia. In June 2013, Pena and the rest of the El Salvador team played against Turkey and lost 3–0, Pena then played against Australia and in a historic game in El Salvador footballing history they won their first game in a world cup (outside on a beach soccer world cup) 2-1 and he played a major part in the victory scoring the second goal which help secure the result.

Honours

International
El Salvador U21
  : Central American Games 2013

External links
 Diego Coca at playmakerstats.com (English version of ceroacero.es)

1994 births
Living people
Salvadoran footballers
Association football forwards